Oriel Wind Farm is a proposed offshore wind farm in the northwestern Irish Sea.  The project is associated with Oriel Windfarm Limited, a privately owned Irish renewable energy company.

The farm takes its name from the ancient Kingdom of Oriel.

Environmental impact
Detailed surveys and studies of the physical, ecological, and human environment at the proposed wind farm site have been carried out since 2003. These included geotechnical assessments of the area and surveys of birds flying above the site.

Construction
In 2007, the proposed developers suggested that if permission was obtained, "construction could commence as early as Autumn 2009". However, as of 2014, the project was on hold pending talks between the Irish and UK governments on exporting the electricity to the UK.

In July 2015, the companies Oriel Windfarm and Gaelectric announced a proposed co-development of a 15MW demonstration project, to potentially include the development of a research and development hub for offshore energy. The two companies suggested that the project, termed the North Irish Sea Array, had the potential to produce 870MW of electricity.

Output
If completed as per the 2007 proposals, the wind farm would reportedly be capable of generating up to 330 megawatts of electricity. The generated electricity could be fed into the Irish national electrical grid, with some of the output exported via interconnector to the UK and European energy markets.

References

Wind farms in the Republic of Ireland
Offshore wind farms in the Irish Sea
Proposed wind farms
Proposed renewable energy power stations in the Republic of Ireland